Women's Nordic Football Championship was an international football competition contested by the women's national football teams of the Nordic countries. The tournament was held annually between 1974 and 1982. Finland, Denmark and Sweden competed from the start, Norway joined the tournament in 1978. Iceland and Faroe Islands did not take part at the competition.

Results

Medal summary

General statistics

Top goalscorers

10 goals
  Pia Sundhage
8 goals
  Lone Smidt Nielsen
7 goals
  Annette Frederiksen
  Susanne Niemann
  Birgitta Söderström
6 goals
  Ann Jansson

5 goals
  Görel Sintorn
  Karin Ödlund
4 goals
  Anne Grete Holst
3 goals
  Eva Andersson
  Britta Ehmsen
  Inge Hindkjær

See also
Nordic Football Championship (Men's)
FIFA Women's World Cup
Football at the Summer Olympics
Algarve Cup

External links
Nordic Championships (Women) - Overview Rec.Sport.Soccer Statistics Foundation

 
Women's international association football competitions
Defunct international association football competitions in Europe
Recurring sporting events established in 1974
Recurring sporting events disestablished in 1982